WAVE is an English-language, monthly magazine published by Annapurna Media Pvt. Ltd. The company acquired the magazine in 2013. Each month, the magazine publishes articles addressing the youth and their varied interests. Apart from touching on the lighter fun side, it also addresses more "serious" aspects - but from a youthful perspective. The magazine has a large impact on the urban Nepali youth. 

WAVE magazine is based in Kupondole, Lalitpur.

References

External links
Official Site

1994 establishments in Nepal
English-language magazines
Magazines established in 1994
Magazines published in Nepal
Monthly magazines
Youth magazines